Javier Jiménez Espriú (born 31 July 1937) is a Mexican academic and former Secretary of Communications and Transportation of Mexico. He is the former head of the engineering school at the National Autonomous University of Mexico. He was Under Secretary of Communications and Technological Development of the Secretariat of Communications and Transport when Miguel de la Madrid was president (1982-1988). Additionally, he was the CEO of Mexicana de Aviación, what was once one of the largest Mexican airlines, from 1994 to 1995.1

He was appointed the Secretary of Communications and Transportation by President Andrés Manuel López Obrador in December 2018.

During his term, Espriú has been heavily involved in the controversial decision by President Obrador to cancel the construction of the new Mexico City Texcoco Airport. He alleges the decision to cancel construction was because of financial constraints and not because of corruption, as Obrador alleges.

References

1937 births
Living people
Academic staff of the National Autonomous University of Mexico
Mexican Secretaries of Communications and Transportation
Cabinet of Andrés Manuel López Obrador